

Roster

Schedule
 
|-
!colspan=9| Regular Season

|-
!colspan=9| 1974 NCAA Tournament

Rankings

References

Creighton Bluejays men's basketball seasons
Creighton Bluejays
Creighton
Creighton Bluejays men's bask
Creighton Bluejays men's bask